Chaurikharka  is a village development committee in Solukhumbu District in the Sagarmatha Zone of northeastern Nepal. At the time of the 1991 Nepal census it had a population of 2422 people living in 502 individual households.

Gallery

References

External links
UN map of the municipalities of Solukhumbu District

Populated places in Solukhumbu District
Khumbu Pasanglhamu